The Office of the Chief of Defence Staff (OCDS) is the Sri Lanka Armed Forces operational level headquarters of the Chief of the Defence Staff (CDS), responsible for coordinating joint armed force's operations. However the respective service commands have much autonomy for their deployments. 

It was formerly known as the Joint Operations Headquarters (JOH). The JOH was created in 1999 replacing the civilian Joint Operations Bureau which had existed briefly in 1999. The origins of the JOH could be traced back to the Joint Operations Command (JOC) established in 1985 due to the need of co-ordination of operations among the tri-services and the police with the escalation of the Sri Lankan Civil War. The head of the JOC is the Chief of the Defence Staff (CDS), currently. The duties of the CDS was extended by the Chief of Defence Staff Act No. 35 of 2009. JOH is located in Colombo.

See also 
 Chief of the Defence Staff

References

External links 
 Daluwatte given over-riding powers over services chiefs
 A new body and a new head to counter terrorism

1999 establishments in Sri Lanka
Defence agencies of Sri Lanka
Government agencies established in 1999
Military of Sri Lanka
Sri Lankan commands